Deo Tibba is a mountain located in Kullu District, Himachal Pradesh, India at a height of 5,985 metres.  It is situated in the Pir Panjal Range of mountains. It lies to the southwest of Manali above Jagatsukh village. The first reconnaissance of Deo Tibba was made by General Bruce's guide, Furrer, who reported that one of its ridges looked climbable from the Hamta nala. The route to the summit of this peak has a challenging terrain- a climber has to cross over steep ice passes, glaciers with crevasses, rock fall area and moraine. The peak is exceptional in a way that the summit is not a pointed ridge but a snow dome just like an ice cap, with a flat summit plateau. It requires a load ferry, crossing technical terrain difficulties, using fixed ropes, crampons, ice axe etc. It is sometimes misunderstood as a beginner's peak for aspiring mountaineers as it relatively lower when compared to Stok Kangri , but is less often climbed. Local and international teams attempt this peak often alongside Mt. Indrasan (6221 m), the two being connected via the high Duhangan Col. by 

As per local beliefs, Deo Tibba is the assembly site of the gods. According to the Hindu mythology, the dome shaped peak of Deo Tibba is where the gods sit. Hence the name Deo meaning ‘Gods’ and Tibba meaning ‘hill'.

References

Kullu district
Mountains of Himachal Pradesh